Cleo Pires Ayrosa Galvão (born 2 October 1982), known mononymously as Cleo, is a Brazilian actress and singer.

Career 
She made her debut as an actress when she participated in the Memorial de Maria Moura mini-series in 1994. It was a quick participation of just one episode in which the protagonist, Maria Moura, as a young woman, was replaced by her mother, Glória Pires, in the adulthood of the character. After that, she distanced herself from TV and the media, believing that she had no vocation to follow in her mother's footsteps. Cleo says she saw Gloria working day and night without stopping, the press invading her privacy and the phone ringing all the time, and that she did not want it for her future. She still says she just did not stand in the middle before, out of lack of will. Not that she had anything against her career, but it was something she did not think about, it was not in her head. A curious fact is that even the film being one of her passions, when asked if she wanted to be an actress, immediately thought of novels and theater, things that had no interest or curiosity.

Until, in 2003, she met Monique Gardenberg in a bathroom, and was invited to star in the movie Benjamin. Cleo says that she was surprised by such trust placed in her and therefore accepted the invitation. After much training and many rehearsals, since she had never made movies before, she filmed the film, whose script was based on the eponymous book by Chico Buarque. As soon as she finished the work and saw the result, she fell in love with the profession and decided that it was what she wanted. Even though she never took an acting course, she received praise for her performance and competed for several awards in the category of Best Actress, winning the Rio Festival.

In 2004, she was invited to star in the remake of the novel Cabocla, in the title role interpreted by her mother in the 1979 version. To avoid comparisons, and, believing that it would be too much responsibility to star in a novela and did not have enough preparation, the invitation, being replaced by the actress Vanessa Giácomo, who got the better after a battery of tests.

She shot to fame as one of the great revelations of the national drama, in interpreting the sexy Lurdinha novel América, Globo in 2005, becoming a sex symbol. That same year, she was named the sexiest woman in the Brazil. According to Cleo, she only accepted the invitation to make the novela by knowing as much work as the author of its director, and, therefore, believe that it would be a good experience for her life. Also in 2005, Cleo attended the special program of the final year of the globe, in interpreting Cleopatra in the children's special, Clara e o Chuveiro do Tempo.  She would also do a part in the special edition of the humorous Casseta & Planeta, Urgente! of end of year, however, due to health problems, was replaced by the singer Wanessa Camargo. In 2006, she played the rebel Letícia in Cobras & Lagartos.

For the paid channel Telecine Premium, hosted the Cineview, program that showed the news of the world of the cinema . After a reformulation, the attraction was called Moviebox, with a presentation by Daniel de Oliveira. In that same period, after almost two years of negotiations, she accepted to be cover of the magazine Nova, where she posed wearing only collars and a panties, lavishing style and sensuality.

In 2008, she co-starred in the remake of Ciranda de Pedra, in which she lived the young teacher Margarida, a shy girl, who falls in love with the beautiful and honest engineer Eduardo. In 2009, she joined the cast of the soap opera Caminho das Índias, in which she played the Indian Surya, her first villain. Also in that year, after the resignation of the actress Juliana Paes in acting in the long one The Expendables, of Sylvester Stallone, Cleo was chosen to replace her. However, due to the novel by Glória Perez , her participation in the film could not be fulfilled. The role ended up with the actress Giselle Itié. Again, she was named one of the 25 sexiest women in the country, by Istoé Gente magazine .

Still in 2008, she recorded the film My Name Is Not Johnny and the following year recorded a film that tells the life story of Brazilian President Luiz Inácio Lula da Silva , Lula, the Son of Brazil , playing Lula's first wife, Maria Lurdes.

In August 2010 Cleo was the cover model for the Brazilian edition of Playboy magazine, in a special edition with 50 pages commemorating the 35 years of the magazine. In 2010/2011 she played India Estela, the protagonist of the telenovel Araguaia. The following year she starred in the episode " The Angel of Alagoas ", from the series As Brasileiras , directed by Daniel Filho. Cleo played Ana Terra in young stage of the film O Tempo e o Vento, a character who was his mother in miniseries of the same name in 1985.

Between 2012 and 2013, she played cosmopolitan Bianca in Salve Jorge. In 2014, back to TV, playing the fragile Katya, Alexander's wife (Alejandro Claveaux), who has an affair with the brother-André (Cauã Reymond) in O Caçador. In 2016, she participates in Haja Coração as Tamara , a romantic couple of Apollo Malvino Salvador. She can also be seen as Sabrina in Supermax, again working with Mariana Ximenes. In 2017, changes her stage name, adopting only Cleo. On September 1, 2017, Cléo participated in the new music video of the singer sertanejo Gusttavo Lima titled "Eu Vou Te Buscar" that in addition to bringing his participation, the rapper Hungary Hip Hop also participates in Pirenópolis, Goiás local of the recording of the video.

Filmography

Film

Television

Discography

Extended Play (EP)
 2018: Jungle Kid
 2018: Melhor Que Eu

Awards and nominations

References

External links

 
 

1982 births
Living people
English-language singers from Brazil
Actresses from Rio de Janeiro (city)
Brazilian film actresses
Brazilian telenovela actresses
21st-century Brazilian actresses
21st-century Brazilian singers
21st-century Brazilian women singers